Taraclia may refer to:

Taraclia, a city
Taraclia County, a former administrative subdivision of Moldova
Taraclia district, an administrative subdivision of Moldova
Taraclia, Căuşeni, a commune in Căuşeni district, Moldova
Taraclia, a village in Plopi Commune, Cantemir district
Taraclia, a village in Sadîc Commune, Cantemir district
Taraclia de Salcie, a commune in Cahul district